Illinois Reports is the official reporter of the Illinois Supreme Court. It is published by Thomson Reuters, under contract with the Illinois Supreme Court Reporter of Decisions. The Illinois Supreme Court retains the copyright.

For purposes of citation, Illinois Reports and Illinois Reports Second are abbreviated "Ill." and "Ill. 2d"; although, the oldest volumes are abbreviated "Breeze", "Gilm.", and "Scam.", for Breeze's Illinois Reports, Gilman's Illinois Reports, and Scammon's Illinois Reports.

The publication is separate from Illinois Decisions--a popular unofficial reporter also published by Thomson Reuters--that contains additional materials, such as the West Key Number System.

See also
 Illinois Appellate Reports
 Law of Illinois

References
 705 ILCS 65/4
 Cardiff Index to Legal Abbreviations:Breeze's Illinois Reports
 Cardiff Index to Legal Abbreviations:Gilman's Illinois Reports
 Cardiff Index to Legal Abbreviations:Scammon's Illinois Reports

External links
 Illinois Reports (Full Text of Various Editions)
 Chronological Index to Information Contained in the Illinois Supreme Court Reporters, Excluding Opinions
 The Lawyer's Reference Manual of Law Books and Citations: American Reports: Illinois (1884) (Notes on Volumes and Editions)
 Illinois Official Court Reports Act (705 ILCS 65/)
 Illinois Supreme Court Support Staff & Contact Information (Illinois Supreme Court Reporter of Decisions)

Case law reporters of the United States
Illinois state courts